Dee Clark (November 7, 1938 – December 7, 1990) was an American soul singer best known for a string of R&B and pop hits in the late 1950s and early 1960s, including the song "Raindrops", which became a million-seller in the United States in 1961.

Career
He was born Delectus Clark or Delecta Clark, Jr. in Blytheville, Arkansas, and moved to Chicago in 1941. His mother, Essie Mae Clark, was a gospel singer and encouraged her son to pursue his love of music. Clark made his first recording in 1952 as a member of the Hambone Kids, who enjoyed some success with a recording of "Hambone" on the OKeh label. In 1953, he joined an R&B group called the Goldentones, who later became the Kool Gents and were discovered by Chicago radio DJ Herb Kent upon winning a talent competition. Kent had the Kool Gents signed to Vee-Jay label's subsidiary Falcon/Abner. The group recorded for Falcon/Abner in 1956, and also recorded a novelty record as "The Delegates".

Clark embarked on a solo career in 1957, initially following the styles of Clyde McPhatter and Little Richard. When Little Richard temporarily abandoned his music career to study the Bible, Clark fulfilled Richard's remaining live dates and also recorded with his backing band, the Upsetters. Over the next four years he landed several moderate hits, two of which ("Just Keep It Up" and "Hey Little Girl") reached the top 20 on the Billboard Hot 100). His records for Abner and Vee-Jay were orchestrated by Riley Hampton. His biggest single, "Raindrops", a power ballad augmented by heavy rain and thunder sound effects and Clark's swooping falsetto, was released in the spring of 1961 and became his biggest hit, soaring to number two on the pop chart and number three on the R&B charts. It sold over one million copies, and was awarded a gold disc. "Raindrops" was also an international success, reaching number one in New Zealand and reaching the top ten in South Africa and Belgium, and selling well in Japan. "Raindrops" remains a staple on oldies and adult standards radio station playlists to this day, and has also been covered by several other artists in the years since, including David Cassidy, Tony Orlando and Dawn, and Narvel Felts, who took the song to number 30 on the country chart in 1974. Clark himself recorded an updated version of "Raindrops" in 1973.

However, Clark's biggest hit was also his last. The follow-up to "Raindrops", "Don't Walk Away from Me", was a flop, and he made the pop charts in America only twice more, with "I'm Going Back to School" (1962) and "Crossfire Time" (1963). By the time "Crossfire Time" came out, Clark had moved from Vee-Jay to the Constellation label. Though he continued to record for Constellation through 1966, none of his records charted nationally. He had considerable local success in Chicago with such standout recordings as "Come Closer" (1964), the double-sided hit of "Warm Summer Breezes" and "Heartbreak" (1964), and "TCB" (1965). He later recorded for the Columbia, Wand, Liberty and Rocky labels, without success. Clark had a brief revival in 1975 when his disco song "Ride a Wild Horse" became a surprise Top 30 hit in the UK Singles Chart, becoming his first chart hit in the UK since "Just Keep It Up".

Afterwards, Clark performed mostly on the oldies circuit. By the late 1980s, he was in dire straits financially, living at The Lone Oaks motel in Toccoa, Georgia. Despite suffering a stroke in 1987, that left him partially paralyzed and with a mild speech impediment, he continued to perform until his death on December 7, 1990, in Smyrna, Georgia, from a heart attack at the age of 52. His last concert was with the Jimmy Gilstrap Band at the Portman Lounge in Anderson, South Carolina.

Chart singles

References

External links
 Dee Clark bio

1938 births
1990 deaths
20th-century African-American male singers
American pop musicians
American soul singers
People from Blytheville, Arkansas
People from Toccoa, Georgia
Singers from Chicago
Vee-Jay Records artists
Wand Records artists
Singers from Arkansas